Hydra (also known as Hydra: The Lost Island) is a 2009 low-budget monster movie by Andrew Prendergast and Peter Sullivan, which blends elements of horror, action, thriller  and classical mythology. It was made for cable TV and subsequently internationally distributed on DVD.

Plot
Young archaeologist Dr. Valerie Cammon (Polly Shannon) and her colleague Dr. Kim (Philip Moon) go by ship to a volcanic island in the Mediterranean sea. While she seeks relics in a cave, a seaquake sinks their ship without survivors. At about the same time all archaeologists except for Dr. Cammon get eaten by the re-awakened ancient Lernaean Hydra.
 
During the tempest, a whole island disappears. Two months later, Vincent (Alex McArthur) and Dixie Camden (Jana Williams) intended to organize a man-hunt for cranky millionaires. Their Captain (Michael Shamus Wiles), unaware of the Hydra, suggests the nearby, aforementioned island as a substitute.
 
Four ex-convicts, Tim Nolan (George Stults), Gwen Russell (Dawn Olivieri), Bob Crick (James Wlcek) and Ronnie Kaplan (Texas Battle), are marooned at the shore and given 24 hours' headstart.
 
The following day the rich hunters (played by Paul Rae, Roark Critchlow, Ricco Ross and William Gregory Lee) arrive, having been informed that their targets are responsible for various crimes similar to their personal losses in their lives (Kaplan killed a woman in a drunk driving accident, Crick raped and murdered another woman, and Gwen hired a hitman to kill her husband, although Nolan was randomly selected as the intended fourth victim had a heart attack during the abduction). However, the hunters attract the Hydra's attention and get eaten. The same fate befalls some of the fugitives.
 
Dr. Cammon runs into the surviving fugitives and helps Tim to find the magic sword of Hercules. As Dr. Cammon tries to distract the Hydra, Tim gets the sword so he can now fight the beast, but, sadly, he retrieves the sword too late and Dr. Cammon is torn apart and eaten by the Hydra. Tim manages to cut off its heads for good, but fails to cut the last head completely off. With Dr. Cammon dead, the remaining fugitives are forced to go on without her help.
 
Eventually, the only ones left are Tim and Gwen and they return to the ship, not knowing that the Hydra has recovered and is following them. Now only one-headed, it can move like a snake and makes its way into the belly of the ship.
 
Gwen wants to use the radio for calling SOS but the microphone is damaged. Mr. Camden blindsides her and blackmails Tim. The Hydra kills Camden from behind, then devours Dixie. Tim grabs the magic sword again and this time, he really kills the monster.

Cast
George Stults as Tim Nolan
Dawn Olivieri as Gwen Russell
Michael Shamus Wiles as Captain Sweet
Alex McArthur as Vincent Camden
Jana Williams Dixie Camden
Texas Battle as Ronnie Caplan
Polly Shannon as Dr. Valerie Cammon
James Wlcek as Bob Crick
Ricco Ross as Broughton
Roark Critchlow as Sean Trotta
William Gregory Lee as Clarence Elkins
Dwayne Adway as Mr Winters
Philip Moon as Dr. Kim

Reviews

See also
 Dragonheart
 The Lost World    
 The Water Horse: Legend of the Deep
 Cyclops

References

External links
 
 
 

2009 television films
2009 films
2000s monster movies
American adventure thriller films
American monster movies
American science fiction action films
American science fiction horror films
CineTel Films films
Films about death games
Films based on classical mythology
Films set on islands
Giant monster films
American horror television films
American thriller television films
Action television films
2000s American films